The Toyota Celica GT-Four is a high performance model of the Celica Liftback that was produced from 1986 to 1999, with a turbocharged 3S-GTE engine, and full-time AWD. It was created to compete in the World Rally Championship, whose regulations dictate that a manufacturer must build road-going versions of the vehicle in sufficient numbers. These vehicles are referred to as "homologation special vehicles".

The Celica GT-Four came in three generations; the ST165, based on the fourth generation Celica, and manufactured between October 1986 and August 1989; the "super round" shape ST185 produced from September 1989 to September 1993; and the ST205, built from February 1994 to June 1999.

The Celica GT-Four production cars were built at Toyota's Tahara plant in Aichi Prefecture, Japan, and the rally cars were prepared by Toyota Team Europe in Cologne, Germany.

The Celica GT-Four ST165 made its World Rally Championship (WRC) debut in the 1988 Tour de Corse, with its first WRC victory coming in the 1989 Rally Australia. The ST185's WRC debut was in the 1992 Rally Monte Carlo, and its first WRC win was in the 1992 Safari Rally, which was one of its four victories in that year. The ST185 is Toyota's most successful rally car. It won the WRC Drivers' Championship in 1992, and the WRC Manufacturers' and Drivers' championships in 1993 and 1994. The ST205 came in late 1994, and became the official rally car in 1995 with one WRC victory. It also won the 1996 European Rally Championship.

The significance of the Toyota Celica GT-Four in WRC history, previously dominated by European manufacturers, is that it was the first time a Japanese car manufacturer entered the WRC with an AWD turbocharged car, took trophies and won the titles. Since then other Japanese manufacturers have been successful in the WRC. Toyota preceded the Mitsubishi (Lancer Evolution and Galant VR-4) and the Subaru (Legacy and Impreza), but not the Mazda (Mazda 323GT-R & 323GT-X). Toyota later exited the WRC to concentrate their racing efforts in Formula One, but in 2017, 11 years after the Celica was discontinued, Toyota returned to WRC with the Toyota Yaris.

Toyota Team Europe (TTE) was also the first to introduce the anti-lag system (ALS) in their Group A ST205 Celica GT-Four rally cars, a technological breakthrough that was later adopted by other teams.

ST165 (1986–1989)

The Celica GT-Four concept started with a convertible prototype displayed at 1985 Tokyo Motor Show. The white car with burgundy interior is the first car to be called Celica GT-Four with the theme "open air 4WD motoring". The convertible never went into production, but the concept went to the liftback model which began production in October 1986.

The ST165 GT-Four can be distinguished from the front-wheel-drive Celica by its front bumper, which has larger openings and round fog lights on each side, and the "GT-Four" decals on the doors. Inside, the original GT-Four has a differential lock switch near the hand brake for the pre-facelift model built from October 1986 to September 1987.

The Celica GT-Four was updated in October 1987. As with other front-drive Celicas, the ST165 received a new grille, tail lights, and alloys. The export version also has ground effects, noticeably the side spoilers and standard dual front round fog lights. The center differential was changed from a manually lockable unit (either open or locked) to a viscous-coupling limited-slip type. The GT-Four was marketed in the US as the All-Trac Turbo and in Canada as the Turbo 4WD.

The ST165 was not sold in North America before 1988 except for seventy-seven special-edition cars sold to commemorate Toyota's IMSA GTO championship win. These Celicas are all white with white wheels and blue interiors and have "IMSA GTO Champion" printed in small letters on the side moulding, as well as white stripes on the grills. One car was sold at each of the 77 Toyota dealerships in California. They were sold in 1987 as 1988 models, and have viscous-coupling center differentials.

When the Celica GT-Four was launched in the United Kingdom in 1988 it was the first car sold in the United Kingdom designed to run only on unleaded gasoline. 

The ST165 was the only car to be sold with the first version of Toyota's 3S-GTE.

ST185 (1989–1993)

The first 21 units of the Celica ST185 were built in December 1988 as prototypes for various tests. The production model was launched in Japan in September 1989, and delivery began a month later.

The 3S-GTE in the ST185 GT-Four features an air-to-air intercooler and CT26 twin entry turbo to eliminate exhaust gas interference. The Full-time 4WD system in the GT-Four has viscous coupling center limited slip differential and some models are equipped with a Torsen rear differential.

All export market GT-Four are wide-body Liftback models with flared fenders. The Japanese market GT-Four was also offered as normal/narrow body from 1989 to 1991.

In August 1990, the wide body GT-Four A was added into the Japanese lineup. Super Live Sound System with 10 speakers became standard on the GT-Four A.

There are three gearboxes for ST185 GT-Four. The E150F with 4.285 final gear ratio was installed in the Japanese market and All-Trac. European and Australian specs come with E151F with 3.933 ratio. The Japanese market only GT-Four Rally has E152F with close ratio on the 1st through 4th gear and 4.285 final ratio. All the RC/Carlos Sainz/Group A Rallye have E151F.

Anti-lock braking system (ABS), Leather interior, Sunroof, and System 10 Premium Sound System are optional on '90–'92 All-Trac Turbo, and standard on '93 model year All-Trac Turbo. With its sport-style interior, power-operated driver's seat, auto tilt-away steering wheel, SRS Airbag, and cruise control as standard equipment, the ST185 All-Trac Turbo was the most expensive Celica yet.

The European versions have standard ABS. Headlight washers and heated door mirrors are also offered. Sunroof came standard in the UK models, or optional for cars in the Continent. However, System 10 Premium Sound System and Leather interior were only available as options in selected European countries, and were not offered in the UK.

The Australian spec was less luxurious than other destination models. Cruise control, leather, and sunroof were not offered. Early models didn't have ABS and fog lights which became standard few months after introduction. However, Australia was the country with the large numbers of ST185.

Like other Celicas, the GT-Four received minor changes in August 1991 for the 1992 model year. This facelift included the new Toyota ellipse emblems on the hood and trunk, restyled tail lights with smoked red frame, and shorter gear shift. The Japanese models also got round-shape front fog lights. The All-Trac Turbo retained the automatic air conditioner, but the fan switch was changed from the push button type to the more conventional rotary type.

GT-Four RC 

To meet the FIA requirement for WRC, the homologation rally edition of 5000 units was known as the GT-Four RC was launched in September 1991 for the Japanese market. The export version is known as Carlos Sainz (CS) Limited Edition in Singapore and Europe (in honour of their famous WRC driver), or Group A Rallye in Australia. 
Special features include:
 a water-to-air intercooler instead of the standard air-to-air unit, which was much better suited for competition use.
 different hood used to evacuate air from the engine bay rather than direct it to the intercooler (along with a small inlet duct for timing belt cooling).
 different bumper that is much lighter and has more openings than the standard one.
 shortened shift lever throw and clutch pedal travel.
 triple cone synchromesh on gears 2 and 3, up from double cone.
 a special numbered plaque on the center console.

Out of 5000 units, 1800 were for Japanese market, 3000 were allocated to Europe, 150 were delivered to Australia, 25 for Singapore, and very few made a trip to the general markets.

ST205 (1994–1999)

The Celica GT-Four ST205 was launched for the Japanese market in February 1994, and for the Australian, European, and British markets in the mid-year. Influenced strongly by Toyota Team Europe, Toyota's factory team in the World Rally Championship, the final version of the GT-Four included improvements such as an all-aluminum hood to save weight, four-channel ABS (optional for the Japanese market), an improved (enthusiast dubbed) CT20B twin entry turbocharger, and "Super Strut Suspension".

The 2500 units homologation cars built to allow Toyota to enter the GT-Four as a Group A car in the World Rally Championship also featured extras such as all of the plumbing required to activate an anti-lag system, a water spray bar and pump for the front intercooler, a basic water injection system, a small hood-mounted spoiler aft of the windscreen washers (also standard fit on all UK cars) and an extender rear spoiler mounted on risers. Out of the 2500 GT-Four WRC built, 2100 stayed in Japan, 300 were exported to Europe, 77 for Australia, 5 for New Zealand and a few to the general markets.
The Japanese market ST205 came with a standard automatic climate control air conditioner, but ABS was initially optional and became standard from August 1996. Export WRC models only received a manual air conditioner system but all came with standard ABS.

Official WRC models in the initial 2500 were only produced in 1994 as required by the WRC homologation rules. All ST205 sold in Australia were WRC models and called the GT-Four Group A Rallye. All the Australian-spec ST205 came with leather interior, and the only options were air conditioner and glass sunroof. Each of 77 cars also came with limited edition numbered plaque mounted ahead of the gear shift. Instead of using the Super Strut Suspension as found in the production cars, the actual ST205 rally cars for WRC came with standard strut suspension as they found the wear rates too high from the rigors of rallying.

In August 1995, the ST205 received minor changes which consisted of new 6-spoke alloys, contoured side spoilers or rocker panels, and a redesigned rear spoiler. The Japanese model also got restyled tail lights. Sport ABS and dual SRS Airbag became standard on all cars started from August 1996. The high WRC-style rear spoiler was not available for this facelift model, but returned on the second minor change in December 1997. Other new feature for the final facelift model were 3-spoke leather steering wheel with SRS Airbag and projector headlights.

During the 1995 World Rally Championship season, Toyota was caught using illegal turbo restrictors at the Rally Catalunya and were given a one-year ban by the FIA. FIA president Max Mosley called the illegal turbo restrictor "the most sophisticated device I've ever seen in 30 years of motor sports." Toyota and their drivers, Juha Kankkunen, Didier Auriol and Armin Schwarz, were also stripped of all points in the championships. Kankkunen was leading the Drivers Championship heading into Catalunya, while Auriol was also in the title race. Mosley stated that "there is no suggestion the drivers were aware of what was going on."

Although TTE was banned for the 1996 World Rally Championship season, the Celica ST205 still competed in 1996 and 1997 World Rally Championship season ran by private teams, most notably HF Grifone from Italy and Toyota importers in certain countries.

Rally results

World Rally Championship (WRC) 
 ST165 won 13 WRC series. Carlos Sainz won the 1990 WRC Driver's Title.
 ST185 won 16 full WRC series, and 3 overall winner in the W2L series. WRC Driver's Titles with Carlos Sainz in 1992, Juha Kankkunen in 1993, and Didier Auriol in 1994. WRC Manufacturer's Titles in 1993 and 1994.
 ST205 won 1 full WRC series, and 2 overall winner in the W2L series.

 WRC victories 

{|class="wikitable" style="font-size: 95%; "
! No.
! Event
! Season
! Driver
! Co-driver
! Car
|-
| 1
|  2nd Commonwealth Bank Rally Australia
| 1989
|  Juha Kankkunen
|  Juha Piironen
| Toyota Celica GT-Four ST165
|-
| 2
|  38th Marlboro Safari Rally
| 1990
|  Björn Waldegård
|  Fred Gallagher
| Toyota Celica GT-Four ST165
|-
| 3
|  37th Acropolis Rally
| 1990
|  Carlos Sainz
|  Luis Moya
| Toyota Celica GT-Four ST165
|-
| 4
|  20th Rothmans Rally of New Zealand
| 1990
|  Carlos Sainz
|  Luis Moya
| Toyota Celica GT-Four ST165
|-
| 5
|  40th 1000 Lakes Rally
| 1990
|  Carlos Sainz
|  Luis Moya
| Toyota Celica GT-Four ST165
|-
| 6
|  46th Lombard RAC Rally
| 1990
|  Carlos Sainz
|  Luis Moya
| Toyota Celica GT-Four ST165
|-
| 7
|  59ème Rallye Automobile de Monte-Carlo
| 1991
|  Carlos Sainz
|  Luis Moya
| Toyota Celica GT-Four ST165
|-
| 8
|  25º Rallye de Portugal
| 1991
|  Carlos Sainz
|  Luis Moya
| Toyota Celica GT-Four ST165
|-
| 9
|  35ème Tour de Corse
| 1991
|  Carlos Sainz
|  Luis Moya
| Toyota Celica GT-Four ST165
|-
| 10
|  21st Rothmans Rally of New Zealand
| 1991
|  Carlos Sainz
|  Luis Moya
| Toyota Celica GT-Four ST165
|-
| 11
|  11º Rally Argentina
| 1991
|  Carlos Sainz
|  Luis Moya
| Toyota Celica GT-Four ST165
|-
| 12
|  27º Rallye Catalunya-Costa Brava
| 1991
|  Armin Schwarz
|  Arne Hertz
| Toyota Celica GT-Four ST165
|-
| 13
|  41st International Swedish Rally
| 1992
|  Mats Jonsson
|  Lars Bäckman
| Toyota Celica GT-Four ST165
|-
| 14
|  40th Martini Safari Rally Kenya
| 1992
|  Carlos Sainz
|  Luis Moya
| Toyota Celica GT-Four ST185
|-
| 15
|  22nd Rothmans Rally of New Zealand
| 1992
|  Carlos Sainz
|  Luis Moya
| Toyota Celica GT-Four ST185
|-
| 16
|  28º Rallye Catalunya-Costa Brava
| 1992
|  Carlos Sainz
|  Luis Moya
| Toyota Celica GT-Four ST185
|-
| 17
|  48th Lombard RAC Rally
| 1992
|  Carlos Sainz
|  Luis Moya
| Toyota Celica GT-Four ST185
|-
| 18
|  61ème Rallye Automobile de Monte-Carlo
| 1993
|  Didier Auriol
|  Bernard Occelli
| Toyota Celica GT-Four ST185
|-
| 19
|  42nd International Swedish Rally
| 1993
|  Mats Jonsson
|  Lars Bäckman
| Toyota Celica GT-Four ST185
|-
| 20
|  41st Trustbank Safari Rally
| 1993
|  Juha Kankkunen
|  Juha Piironen
| Toyota Celica GT-Four ST185
|-
| 21
|  13º Rally Argentina
| 1993
|  Juha Kankkunen
|  Nicky Grist
| Toyota Celica GT-Four ST185
|-
| 22
|  43rd 1000 Lakes Rally
| 1993
|  Juha Kankkunen
|  Denis Giraudet
| Toyota Celica GT-Four ST185
|-
| 23
|  6th Telecom Rally Australia
| 1993
|  Juha Kankkunen
|  Nicky Grist
| Toyota Celica GT-Four ST185
|-
| 24
|  49th Network Q RAC Rally
| 1993
|  Juha Kankkunen
|  Nicky Grist
| Toyota Celica GT-Four ST185
|-
| 25
|  28º TAP Rallye de Portugal
| 1994
|  Juha Kankkunen
|  Nicky Grist
| Toyota Celica GT-Four ST185
|-
| 26
|  42nd Trustbank Safari Rally
| 1994
|  Ian Duncan
|  David Williamson
| Toyota Celica GT-Four ST185
|-
| 27
|  38ème Tour de Corse
| 1994
|  Didier Auriol
|  Bernard Occelli
| Toyota Celica GT-Four ST185
|-
| 28
|  14º Rally Argentina
| 1994
|  Didier Auriol
|  Bernard Occelli
| Toyota Celica GT-Four ST185
|-
| 29
|  36º Rallye Sanremo
| 1994
|  Didier Auriol
|  Bernard Occelli
| Toyota Celica GT-Four ST185
|-
| 30
|  39ème Tour de Corse
| 1995
|  Didier Auriol
|  Denis Giraudet
| Toyota Celica GT-Four ST205
|-
|}

Overall Winner in the W2L Series

{|class="wikitable" style="font-size: 95%; "
! No.
! Event
! Season
! Driver
! Co-driver
! Car
|-
| 1
|  43rd International Swedish Rally
| 1994
|  Thomas Rådström
|  Lars Bäckman
| Toyota Celica GT-Four ST185
|-
| 2
|  30º Rallye Catalunya-Costa Brava
| 1994
|  Enrico Bertone
|  Massimo Chiapponi
| Toyota Celica GT-Four ST185
|-
| 3
|  43rd 555 Safari Rally
| 1995
|  Yoshio Fujimoto
|  Arne Hertz
| Toyota Celica GT-Four ST185
|-
| 4
|  30º TAP Rallye de Portugal
| 1996
|  Rui Madeira
|  Nuno da Silva
| Toyota Celica GT-Four ST205
|-
| 5
|  52nd Network Q RAC Rally
| 1996
|  Armin Schwarz
|  Denis Giraudet
| Toyota Celica GT-Four ST205
|-
|}

Other important rallies 
 ST165 won the 1989 and 1990 British Rally Championship, and 1990 Asia Pacific Rally Championship.
 ST185 won the 1995 European Rally Championship.
 ST185 won the 1997 Rally of Malaysia.
 ST205 won the 1996 European Rally Championship and together with the Corolla WRC won the 1998 FIA Teams Cup for the HF Grifone team.

References

Further reading
 Toyota Celica 25 Years of Development and Motorsport book written by Brian Long, published in England.

External links

 Turbocelica.nl – A resource for the ST185 GT-Four Carlos Sainz models.

Celica GT-Four
All-wheel-drive vehicles
Sports cars
Rally cars
Coupés
Hatchbacks
1980s cars
1990s cars
Auto racing controversies